Jean-Pierre Granger (11 March 1779, in Paris – 1 December 1840, in Paris) was a French painter who worked in the Neo-Classical style. He is primarily known for portraits, history paintings and mythological scenes, but also created numerous religious works. Some sources incorrectly call him Jean-Perrin.

Biography 
His father was a glazier. At the age of six, he became a drum major in the "Régiment Royal-Bonbons", a children's branch of the French Guards which was intended to provide "manly, patriotic training", but also served as a form of amusement for the Dauphin.

Two years later, his father made the acquaintance of Angélique Briceau (fl.1780-1800), a watercolorist who gave lessons to both of them. Shortly after, she married , who then gave them lessons in engraving. Granger worked as an engraver for seven years, but eventually felt constrained by the limits of that medium and entered the studios of  Jean-Baptiste Regnault to study oil painting. Four years later, he worked closely with  Jacques-Louis David.

In 1800, he was awarded the Prix de Rome for his painting of Antiochus sending his son to Scipio. His colleague, Ingres, who came in second, accused David of using his influence on the jury.

While in Rome, he worked for Lucien Bonaparte, making sketches and paintings of the Prince's antiquities collection. He also began a portrait of Bonaparte's wife, Alexandrine de Bleschamp, but he (and some others) found it unsatisfactory, so he turned it into a painting of an anonymous lady of the court. This portrait (now in the Louvre) pleased him so much that he married the model, Jeanne-Catherine Delaigle.

He returned to Paris in 1812, and exhibited annually at the Salon until his death, receiving medals in 1812, 1817 and 1820.

His daughter, Eléonore Palmyre (1819-1874), a pianist of some note, married the writer Paul Meurice. Her portrait was painted by Ingres, who had apparently gotten over his grudge and become her godfather. It is currently on display at the Maison de Victor Hugo.

References

Further reading 
 Alexandre Péron, "Notice nécrologique sur Jean-Pierre Granger", in Annales de la Société libre des Beaux-Arts, 1840-1846, XV, Paris, 1846, pages 149-173.

External links

 Portrait of Granger by Ingres @ the National Gallery of Australia.

1779 births
1840 deaths
French history painters
French portrait painters
Prix de Rome for painting
Painters from Paris
19th-century French painters